Fortunato Antonio Spruit (11 July 1880 – 12 July 1943) was a Dutch Catholic missionary prelate and bishop of the Roman Catholic Diocese of Lu'an from 1927 to 1943.

Biography
Fortunato Antonio Spruit was born in Oudewater, Utrecht, Kingdom of the Netherlands, on 11 July 1880. He joined the Franciscans in 1899. He was ordained a priest on 25 March 1906. On 16 May 1907, he was sent to the Qing Empire to preach in Hubei. He was unanimously chosen as bishop of the Roman Catholic Diocese of Lu'an following the resignation of Albertus Odoricus Timmer in 1927.  

On 8 December 1941, the Pacific War broke out. In 1943, Fortunato Antonio Spruit and Albertus Odoricus Timmer were detained by the Imperial Japanese Army in Taiyuan, and died on July 12.

References

1880 births
1943 deaths
People from Oudewater
Dutch Roman Catholic missionaries
Dutch Roman Catholic bishops
Chinese Roman Catholic bishops